The right to homeland is according to some legal scholars a universal human right, which is derived from the Universal Declaration of Human Rights, including its Article 9. The concept evolved in German jurisprudence and is recognized in German constitutional law to a certain degree. Notable proponents of the concept include legal scholars Kurl Rabl, Rudolf Laun, Otto Kimminich, Dieter Blumenwitz, Felix Ermacora and Alfred-Maurice de Zayas. The concept is relevant to debates concerning ethnic cleansing in Europe after World War II (notably of Germans and Hungarians), ethnic cleansing in Palestine, Cyprus and other areas.

See also
Aboriginal title
Diaspora politics
Ethnic federalism
Expulsion of the Chagossians
Hawaiian homeland
Home rule
Jewish homeland
Right to exist
Nation state

References

Autonomous administrative divisions
Citizenship
Cultural geography
Decolonization
Diaspora studies
Ethnic conflict
Ethnicity in politics
Homeland
Indigenous land rights
International law legal terminology
Nationality
National questions
Property law legal terminology